Swatch Internet Time (or ) is a decimal time concept introduced in 1998 by the Swatch corporation as part of their marketing campaign for their line of "Beat" watches.

Instead of hours and minutes, the mean solar day is divided into 1,000 parts called . Each  is equal to one decimal minute in the French Revolutionary decimal time system and lasts 1 minute and 26.4 seconds (86.4 seconds) in standard time. Times are notated as a 3-digit number out of 1,000 after midnight. So, for example, @248 would indicate a time 248  after midnight, representing  of a day, just over 5 hours and 57 minutes.

There are no time zones in Swatch Internet Time; instead, it is globally based on what is conventionally known as Central European Time, West Africa Time, and UTC+1, which is the time zone in which Swatch's headquarters in Biel, Switzerland, is located; Swatch calls this "Biel Mean Time" (BMT), despite the fact that it is not actually mean solar time as measured in Biel. Unlike civil time in Switzerland and many other countries, Swatch Internet Time does not observe daylight saving time.

History
Swatch Internet Time was announced on 23 October 1998, in a ceremony at the Junior Summit '98, attended by Nicolas G. Hayek, President and CEO of the Swatch Group, G.N. Hayek, President of Swatch Ltd., and Nicholas Negroponte, founder and then-director of the MIT Media Lab. During the Summit, Swatch Internet Time became the official time system for Nation.1, an online country (supposedly) created and run by children.

Uses

During 1999, Swatch produced several models of watch, branded "Swatch ",  that displayed Swatch Internet Time as well as standard time, and even convinced a few websites (such as CNN.com) to use the new format. PHP's date() function has a format specifier, 'B', which returns the Swatch Internet Time notation for a given time stamp.  It is also used as a time reference on ICQ, and the online role-playing game Phantasy Star Online used it since its launch on the Dreamcast in 2000 to try to facilitate cross-continent gaming (as the game allowed Japanese, American and European players to mingle on the same servers). In March 2001, Ericsson released the T20e, a mobile phone which gave the user the option of displaying Internet Time. Outside these areas, it is infrequently used. While Swatch still offers the concept on its website, it no longer markets Beat watches. In July 2016, Swatch released Touch Zero Two, its second wirelessly connected watch, with Swatch Internet Time function.

Beatnik satellite controversy

In early 1999, Swatch began a marketing campaign about the launch of their Beatnik satellite, intended to service a set of Internet Time watches. They were criticized for planning to use an amateur radio frequency for broadcasting a commercial message (an act banned by international treaties). The satellite was intended to be deployed by hand from the Mir space station. Swatch instead donated the transmitter batteries for use in normal Mir functions, and the satellite never broadcast.

Description
The concept was touted as an alternative, decimal measure of time. One of the supposed goals was to simplify the way people in different time zones communicate about time, mostly by eliminating time zones altogether.

Beats

Instead of hours and minutes, the mean solar day is divided into 1,000 parts called . Each  lasts 1 minute and 26.4 seconds. One  is equal to one decimal minute in French decimal time.

Although Swatch does not specify units smaller than one , third party implementations have extended the standard by adding "centibeats" or "sub-beats", for extended precision: @248.00.

Time zones

There are no time zones; instead, the new time scale of Biel Mean Time (BMT) is used, based on the company's headquarters in Biel, Switzerland. Despite the name, BMT does not refer to mean solar time at the Biel meridian (7°15′E), but to the standard time there. It is equivalent to Central European Time and West Africa Time, or UTC+1.

Like UTC, Swatch Internet Time is the same throughout the world. For example, when the time is 875 , or @875, in New York, it is also @875 in Tokyo. Unlike civil time in most European countries, Internet Time does not observe daylight saving time, and thus it matches Central European Time during (European) winter and Western European Summer Time, which is observed by the United Kingdom, Ireland, Portugal and Spain's Canary Islands during summer.

Notation
The most distinctive aspect of Swatch Internet Time is its notation; as an example, "@248" would indicate a time 248  after midnight, equivalent to a fractional day of 0.248 CET, or 04:57:07.2 UTC. No explicit format was provided for dates, although the Swatch website formerly displayed the Gregorian calendar date in the order day-month-year, separated by periods and prefixed by the letter d (e.g. d31.01.99).

Calculation from UTC+1

Where h is UTC+1 hours and m is UTC+1 minutes. The result is rounded down.

See also
 Traditional Chinese timekeeping – 1  = 10 'beats'
 Metric time
 New Earth Time
 Unix time

References

External links
 
 A short description of Internet time

Time measurement systems
Computer-related introductions in 1998
Units of time
Decimal time
Swiss inventions
1998 in Switzerland